Sintu Majeza (born 4 November 1999) is a South African cricketer. He made his first-class debut on 22 February 2021, for South Western Districts in the 2020–21 CSA 3-Day Provincial Cup. He made his List A debut on 28 February 2021, for South Western Districts in the 2020–21 CSA Provincial One-Day Challenge. In April 2021, he was named in South Western Districts' squad, ahead of the 2021–22 cricket season in South Africa. He made his Twenty20 debut on 24 September 2021, for South Western Districts in the 2021–22 CSA Provincial T20 Knock-Out tournament.

References

External links
 

1999 births
Living people
South African cricketers
South Western Districts cricketers
Place of birth missing (living people)